Ellis and Burnand was a New Zealand sawmilling and timber retailing company, formed by businessman John William Ellis and engineer Harry Burnand in 1891.

Ellis and Burnand Ltd was incorporated in 1903. They were responsible for felling much of the native bush in the southern Waikato and northern Manawatu-Whanganui regions. Their operations expanded initially to supply the timber needs of the North Island Main Trunk railway as it was extended south. Once the railway opened, new mills were built to exploit previously hard to access areas.

Fletcher Holdings bought the company in 1990, rebranding it as PlaceMakers.

Ellis & Burnand's cutting sites were linked to their sawmills by bush tramways, one of which forms the southern end of the Timber Trail cycleway, opened in 2013.

Origins 
Ellis's first venture into timber milling seems to have started at Ōrākau, near Kihikihi (where he ran a store) in 1884, though the sources differ on several dates in this period, some saying it wasn't until 1886. He then employed 4 men on 2 saw benches, powered by an 8 hp portable steam engine.

Having started in 1884, Ellis seems to have left further expansion in milling for a few years. Coulthard Bros had a mill at Ohaupo, which they moved to Rahu, Te Awamutu in 1882. Graham joined the mill in 1883, Stephen N Westney in 1885, then Ellis seems to have joined them at Rangiaohia from 1889 to 1890. 'Established 1889' was on the sign over the Ellis & Burnand Ltd head office in 1905 (see photo above).

In 1889 railway engineer, Harry Burnand, and local storekeeper, John Ellis, spent 6 days taking a canoe down the Ongarue and Whanganui Rivers from Poro-o-tarao tunnel, where Harry was inspector of works.

Sites

Otorohanga 
By the end of the year they were seeking tenders for a short tramway.

Ellis and Burnand became business partners in 1890 (or, more probably, in 1891), when Burnand bought Lewis's interest in the Otorohanga mill and left his railway job. Ellis's partnership with Lewis was dissolved on 12 August 1891, the first reference to 'Ellis and Burnand' being later that month. The tramway was mentioned in 1892. The Otorohanga bush was exhausted and the mill closed in 1912.

Though the mill had closed by then, the 1919 Railways Authorisation Bill included a, "branch line from Otorohanga, along right bank of the Waipa River, to the south boundary of Block VI, Mangaoronga survey district. Length about 7½ miles." The Railway Atlas indicates the line was horse worked, served the Ellis and Burnand Mill, as well as the Rangitoto Colliery, and existed by 1921.

Mangapehi 

Ellis became the confidential adviser of King Tāwhiao, which helped him acquire timber rights over large areas of bush near Manunui, Otorohanga and Mangapehi, so that he focussed on the timber trade and sold his stores about 1897.

By 1901, they had a small portable mill at Tiroa, with some of the timber used for building the larger Mangapehi mill.

This allowed the company to expand, saying in 1909, "My company hold no Crown land for sawmilling purposes other than the sawmillsites at Manunui and Mangapeehi. Our timber-rights are all in the form of agreements with Natives." Other mills established in the 1900s found themselves in difficulties due to more restricted access to native bush. Expansion was also assisted by development the steam hauler, which replaced bullock teams and increased the area of millable bush that could be worked profitably.

The railway needed many totara sleepers. In 1900 10,000 were delivered to Mangapehi, in 1901 20,000 to Ongarue and 5,000 to Mangapehi and another 3,000 to Ongarue in 1903.

Work started in 1902 and Mangapehi mill opened in 1903, or 1904, after lengthy construction, including  of tramway. The tramway was still being built in 1904. In 1905 a Climax loco, able to cope with the 1 in 15 grades, replaced horses.

In 1903, the capital value of Ellis and Burnand's operations was about £30,000. To meet these development costs the company negotiated with the Melbourne-based Kauri Timber Company, which bought a 47.5% stake in Ellis and Burnand in 1904. From then to 1907, the Mangapehi mill did not return a profit, but from 1908 to 1911 the company made net profits of around £10,000 to £18,000 a year. By 1909 the capital of the company had risen to £75,000. That was represented by 4 King-country sawmills and a sash, door, and butter-box factory at Hamilton, the total capacity of the mills being about  a month, employing 3 to 400 men.

As Mangapehi was remote, the development costs included a public hall, social club, billiard rooms, bowling and croquet greens, tennis courts, football and cricket fields, a post office, a school, stores, medical services, ambulance, public library, a railway station and roads.

Ellis & Burnand's profits benefitted from inflation from 1908 to 1924, when royalties for timber were increased, with a new agreement signed in 1925. Almost 200 were then working at Mangapehi. The mill closed in 1968.

In 1936 3 mills and bush areas were bought from Hayward Timber Company at Waimiha, but were exhausted by 1945 and the cottages, mill and most of the staff were transferred to Mangapehi.

Although most of the logs from Maraeroa (in the centre of Pureora forest) were milled at Mangapehi, Ellis & Burnand had a large mill at Maraeroa from 1945 to at least 1965.

Hamilton 
Ellis and Burnand's headquarters were transferred from Otorohanga to Hamilton in 1905 (or 1906) after they bought Coyle & Jolly's Hamilton sash and door factory in 1904 and then expanded it. A tramway and Grey St West were built to the works in 1904 and plans made for a drying kiln, offices and workers housing. By January 1905 the factory had begun production and was employing 40 staff. By 1906 it was producing barrels, furniture and 1,100 butter boxes a day, employing 53. The Hamilton factory was burnt down in 1916 but a larger one replaced it, though box making was transferred to Manunui, leaving joinery, doors, planing, resawing and retailing of timber at Hamilton.

A new head office was started in 1924 on the corner of Bryce and Victoria Streets. It was sold in 1953 and replaced by a new office at the Bryce St yard. By then the Hamilton yard also had an  pre-fabricated house factory able to build over 100 houses a year, and a block board factory with three drying kilns. The houses had been produced for some years prior to 1953, probably about 1934. A seaside cottage was being sold for £55 in 1925. Houses were displayed at Waikato Winter Shows, including a 4-room 'Economy Cottage' in 1932. The former yard is now the site of Hamilton Transport Centre.

Manunui 

After extension of the railway to Taumarunui in 1903, the Waimarino (renamed Manunui) to Ohotaka tramway was built, with a  bridge over the Whanganui River in 1905, though it had only been put out to tender at the beginning of the year.

The timber mill and box factory opened at Manunui in 1907 and a plywood and veneer factory in 1911. Manunui became a mill village, with mill workers' houses on acre blocks. During the depression work for all 270 staff was cut to 4 days a week. The main work then was milling kahikatea for butter boxes and strawberry baskets.

The mill closed in 1942, when the bush had been felled. A fire burnt down the sawmill in 1949, but the Ellis Veneer works and offices were saved.

Ongarue 

Ellis & Burnand bought the Taumarunui Totara Co mill and started to replace it with a much larger one at Ongarue in 1913. By 1953 the tramway extended  from the mill and had 2 locomotives. During the period of maximum output the annual production was 16m feet of native timber. The mill was still registered in 1961. Since 2011 part of the old tramway has formed the Timber Trail.

Waihou and Herriesville 
Ellis & Burnand began its first milling of plantation grown Pinus radiata near Te Aroha, at Herriesville and Waihou, both on the former East Coast Main Trunk railway, from at least 1919 to 1923.

Waimiha 
2 mills were bought at Waimiha in 1936.

Putaruru 
Sawmills were established at Putaruru, producing in the aggregate, after they bought a block of pines at Lichfield and a  mill site in 1951. Cutting started in May 1952. This was their last mill cutting about 6m feet of pine annually.

Raglan 
From 1957 to 1980 there was a timber yard in Raglan, between Bankart and Stewart Streets. A 1964 advert listed sawn and dressed timbers, hardware, paints, wallboards, joinery, doors and plywood, under the slogan "E. & B's are a veritable Aladdin's treasure house".

Directors 

The company was originally run by Ellis and Burnand. In 1903 Henry Valder went into partnership with them as the company became the largest sawmiller in the King Country. Valder became managing director from 1908 until 1932, was chairman of the board from 1918 until 1942, and a long-time district representative and vice president (1917–26) on the Dominion Federated Sawmillers' Association. Other managing directors were H Holder in 1919, C V Valder in 1920, S Valder in 1928, Henry Valder in 1931, A B Collier 1932–1944, Arthur E McCracken in 1945 and A H Delaney in 1953.

Remnants 
Fletcher Holdings proposed to take over in 1979. Purchase was completed in 1980 and branches were converted to the PlaceMakers brand. In Huntly the Ellis & Burnand name was last in the phone book in 1994. $1.96m was paid by the Forestry Service to end Pureora contracts in 1981.

The Hamilton head office and yard site were used for Hamilton Transport Centre in 2001.

Houses, furniture and fittings made by the company remain, as do parts of their tramways, the Timber Trail being especially accessible. A station building remains at Mangapehi, an NZR F class 230 was donated in 1957 for static display at Lake Rotoroa after use as a yard engine at Mangapehi and 5 locomotives are at the Bush Tramway Club.

References

External links 
Photos –

 1905 Mangapehi
 1906 Mananui Tramway bridge over Whanganui River
 1915 Mananui Mill after fire
 1930 Victoria St head office, beside railway crossing
 1945 Hamilton yard
1956 one inch map of Mangapehi and tramway
 1976 Bryce St head office

Manufacturing companies of New Zealand
Companies based in Hamilton, New Zealand
Logging railways in New Zealand